The M-1 visa is a type of student visa in the U.S. reserved for international students attending vocational schools and technical schools.

Application process
In order to obtain an M-1 visa for traveling to the United States, a student must present a signed Form I-20 at a United States embassy or consulate in the student's home country. The I-20 is issued by a designated school official, typically the international student adviser, after the student has fulfilled a school's admissions requirements and presented proof of financial resources. Often, the person is a student at a community college or junior college providing vocational training or technical training and awards associate degrees; a vocational high school; a trade school; or a school of non-academic training other than language training. An applicant must have a fixed residence outside the U.S. that the applicant intends to maintain in order to be approved for an M-1 visa. 

The application of a person seeking an M-1 visa to attend flight school must also include the specific reason for the flight training, the applicant's current employer and job position, the name and relationship of the person paying for the flight training, the applicant's most recent flight certifications and ratings, the aircraft's type and certified take-off weight to be trained on, and the applicant's current rank or title if presently actively employed as a pilot.

Duration of status
A person with an M visa may enter the U.S. up to 30 days prior to the report date or start date of the course of study printed on the Form I-20. A person is admitted into the U.S. under M-1 status for a fixed time period, typically the period necessary to complete the course of study indicated on the Form I-20, plus time for Optional Practical Training after completion of studies, plus an additional 30 days to depart the U.S. The student's total stay in M-1 status in the U.S. may not exceed one year, unless approved for an extension for medical reasons. When the person enters the U.S., the person's I-94 Arrival-Departure Record Card is stamped with a date, unlike students with an F-1 visa. 

A person in M-1 status is considered unlawfully present in the U.S. if the person's Form I-94 expires, the specified date of the person's admission has passed, or either an immigration judge or the Board of Immigration Appeals has ordered that an alien be excluded, deported, or removed. If a student violates their status, the student may be considered unlawfully present in the U.S. immediately, and the student would not be eligible for the thirty-day grace period to depart the U.S. A person who accrues between 180 and 365 days of unlawful presence in the U.S. may be prohibited from reentering the U.S. for three years after leaving the U.S. A person who accrues more than one year of unlawful presence in the U.S. from reentering the U.S. for ten years after leaving the U.S. A person with unlawful presence who leaves the U.S. before the age of 18 1/2, however, will not receive bans for unlawful presence.

A student's M-1 status may be extended if the student continues to be a nonimmigrant maintaining student status, the student has compelling educational reasons or medical reasons (but not academic probation or academic suspension) that caused the delay, and the student can and intends to maintain student status for the extended period. A student's M-1 status may not be extended longer than three years and 30 days from the student's original start date. A student cannot receive extensions if the student cannot complete the course of study within three years of the original program start date, including any decreases in course load.

Spouse and children
The spouse and minor children of a student in M-1 status are typically eligible to enter the U.S. in M-2 status. At time of entry to the U.S., the spouse and minor children must each present an original SEVIS Form I-20 issued in the name of each family member.

Work authorization
While studying, student in M-1 status is not allowed to work on-campus or off-campus.

Optional Practical Training
M-1 students are eligible for a relatively short amount of Optional Practical Training: one month for every four months of study. While an F-1 student can simply file an I-765 Application for Employment Authorization, an M-1 student must also file an I-539 to extend status. The applications are adjudicated at various United States Citizenship and Immigration Services service centers around the country, which sometimes have varying interpretations of the regulations. An application for Optional Practical Training should include the following.

 cover letter explaining the student's situation
 Form I-765
 $410 filing fee payable to Department of Homeland Security
 signed I-20 with Optional Practical Training request (copies are not accepted)
 copy of visa and passport photo page
 2 passport photos
 copy of original I-20 and original financial documents
 current bank statement
 Form I-539
 $370 filing fee made out to Department of Homeland Security
 copy of both side of I-94 card

It is also advisable to include a copy of each application, since the I-765 and I-539 will be adjudicated separately at the service center. The result of an approved I-765 will be an Optional Practical Training card, also known as an Employment Authorization Document. The result of an approved I-539 will be a new I-94 departure card, which the student surrenders upon leaving the United States, to prove that he has left. A student may begin paid work upon receiving the OPT card (and applying for a social security number) even if the I-94 card has not arrived. 

If the United States Citizenship and Immigration Services requires more information for either application, United States Citizenship and Immigration Services will send a request for evidence. Occasionally these requests are for items that were sent in originally; nevertheless, it is best to send them in again immediately. Approvals or denials will arrive separately and after different amounts of time.

Course of study
Students in M-1 status must maintain a full course of study.

Students at a community college or junior college must take at least 12 credit hours as long as that is considered a full-time student by the educational institution. Post-secondary vocational students usually must take at least 18 hours per week of classroom instruction or, if predominantly a shop-based or laboratory-based curriculum, at least 22 hours per week of instruction. Students at a vocational high school or another nonacademic high school usually must attend classes for at least the minimum number of hours per week that the school considers normal progress towards graduation. 

Online classes and distance-education classes that do not require physical attendance are not allowed to count toward the full course of study of a student in M-1 status. 

If the student must take less than a full course of study because of an illness or medical condition, the designated school official must authorize the reduce course of study. The student's illness or medical condition must be documented by a licensed Doctor of Medicine, licensed Doctor of Osteopathic Medicine, or licensed clinical psychologist. A reduced course of study must not last for longer than five months during a course of study.

A student in M-1 status is not allowed to change the subject of study.

Transfers
A student in M-1 status is allowed to transfer to another school only within the first six months of study in M-1 status. A transfer after more than six months of study in M-1 status may be allowed if the student is unable to remain at the original school because of reasons beyond the student's control.

Change of status
Students in M-1 status may not change their status to F-1 status, and they may not change their status to any H status if the training received under M-1 status provided the qualifications for the temporary worker position sought.

Annual limit
There is no maximum number of M-1 visas that may be issued each year.

Statistics

References

External links
 8 CFR 214.2 (m): Link to Title 8, Code of Federal Regulations.
 ICE: Becoming a nonimmigrant student in the United States
 State Department: Student visa information
 educationUSA: A guide to being a foreign student in the United States
 Visa wait times: Visa wait times at consulates around the world

United States visas by type
Student migration
International education industry